Drifting States is a Canadian docufiction film, directed by Denis Côté and released in 2005. The film stars Christian Leblanc as Christian, a man from Montreal who is hiding out in the isolated town of Radisson after mercy killing his chronically ill mother.

The film, Côté's feature-length debut, was shot on a budget of just $80,000, and performed primarily by non-professional actors.

Writing for 24 images, André Roy compared the film to the works of Jacques Leduc, particularly Ordinary Tenderness (Tendresse ordinaire) and The Last Glacier (Le dernier glacier).

The film won a Golden Leopard Award in the Video category at the Locarno Film Festival in 2005, and a Woosuk "Indie Vision" Award at the Jeonju International Film Festival in 2006.

References

External links

2005 films
Canadian docufiction films
Films shot in Quebec
Films directed by Denis Côté
French-language Canadian films
2000s Canadian films